The Book of Joel is collected as one of the twelve minor prophets of the Nevi'im ("Prophets") in the Hebrew Bible, and as a book in its own right in the Christian Old Testament.

Content 
After a superscription ascribing the prophecy to Joel (son of Pethuel), the book may be broken down into the following sections:
 Lament over a great locust plague and a severe drought (1:1–2:17).
 The effects of these events on agriculture, farmers, and on the supply of agricultural offerings for the Temple in Jerusalem, interspersed with a call to national lament (1:1–20).
 A more apocalyptic passage comparing the locusts to an army, and revealing that they are God's army (2:1–11).
 A call to national repentance in the face of God's judgment (2:12–17).
 Promise of future blessings (2:18–32 or 2:18–3:5).
 Banishment of the locusts and restoration of agricultural productivity as a divine response to national penitence (2:18–27).
 Future prophetic gifts to all of God's people, and the safety of God's people in the face of cosmic cataclysm (2:28–32 or 3:1–5).
 Coming judgment on the Kingdom of Judah's enemies: the Philistines, the Kingdom of Edom, and the Kingdom of Egypt (3:1–21 or 4:1–21).

Chapters

The Book of Joel's division into chapters and verses differs widely between editions of the Bible; some editions have three chapters, others four. Translations with four chapters include: the Jewish Publication Society's version of the Hebrew Bible (1917), Jerusalem Bible (1966), New American Bible (Revised Edition, 1970), Complete Jewish Bible (1998), Tree of Life Version (2015)

In the 1611 King James Bible, the Book of Joel is formed by three chapters: the second one has 32 verses, and it is equivalent to the union of the chapter 2 (with 26 verses) and chapter 3 (with 5 verses) of other editions of the Bible.

The differences of the divisions are as follows:

Historical context 
As there are no explicit references in the book to datable persons or events, scholars have assigned a wide range of dates to the book. The main positions are:
 Ninth century BC, particularly in the reign of Joash – a position especially popular among nineteenth-century scholars (making Joel one of the earliest writing prophets). The enemies mentioned – Philistines, Phoenicians, Egypt and Edom – are consistent with this date. The lack of mention of the Assyrians or Babylonians, who were the main enemies of Judah during the eighth, seventh and sixth centuries, leads many conservative scholars to suggest the choice is between this date, and a fourth century date. 
 Early eighth century BC, during the reign of Uzziah (contemporary with Hosea, Amos, and Jonah)
 c. 630–587 BC, in the last decades of the kingdom of Judah (contemporary with Jeremiah, Ezekiel, Habakkuk)
 c. 520–500 BC, contemporary with the return of the exiles and the careers of Zechariah and Haggai.
 The decades around 400 BC, during the Persian period (making him one of the latest writing prophets), or around 350 BC. This is supported by the apparent mention of the 587 BC destruction of Jerusalem as a past event in 3:1 and 3:17, and the mention of Greeks in 3:6.

Evidence produced for these positions includes allusions in the book to the wider world, similarities with other prophets, and linguistic details. Some commentators, such as John Calvin, attach no great importance to the precise dating.

Joel 1 and 2 are preserved in the Dead Sea Scrolls, in fragmentary manuscripts 4Q78, 4Q82, and the Scroll Wadi Muraba’at.

History of interpretation 

The Masoretic text places Joel between Hosea and Amos (the order inherited by the Tanakh and Old Testament), while the Septuagint order is Hosea–Amos–Micah–Joel–Obadiah–Jonah. The Hebrew text of Joel seems to have suffered little from scribal transmission, but is at a few points supplemented by the Septuagint, Syriac, and Vulgate versions, or by conjectural emendation. While the book purports to describe a plague of locusts, some ancient Jewish opinion saw the locusts as allegorical interpretations of Israel's enemies. This allegorical interpretation was applied to the church by many church fathers. Calvin took a literal interpretation of chapter 1, but allegorical view of chapter 2, a position echoed by some modern interpreters. Most modern interpreters, however, see Joel speaking of a literal locust plague given a prophetic/ apocalyptic interpretation.

The traditional ascription of the whole book to the prophet Joel was challenged in the late nineteenth and early twentieth centuries by a theory of a three-stage process of composition: 1:1–2:27 were from the hand of Joel, and dealt with a contemporary issue; 2:28–3:21/3:1–4:21 were ascribed to a continuator with an apocalyptic outlook. Mentions in the first half of the book to the day of the Lord were also ascribed to this continuator. 3:4–8/4:4–8 could be seen as even later. Details of exact ascriptions differed between scholars.

This splitting of the book's composition began to be challenged in the mid-twentieth century, with scholars defending the unity of the book, the plausibility of the prophet combining a contemporary and apocalyptic outlook, and later additions by the prophet.  The authenticity of 3:4–8 has presented more challenges, although a number of scholars still defend it.

Biblical quotes and allusions 

There are many parallels of language between Joel and other Old Testament prophets. They may represent Joel's literary use of other prophets, or vice versa.

In the New Testament, his prophecy of the outpouring of God's Holy Spirit upon all people was notably quoted by Saint Peter in his Pentecost sermon.

Joel 3:10 / 4:10 is a variation of Isaiah 2:4 and Micah 4:3's prophecy, "They will beat their swords into plowshares and their spears into pruning hooks.", instead commanding, "Beat your plowshares into swords and your pruning hooks into spears."

The table below represents some of the more explicit quotes and allusions between specific passages in Joel and passages from the Old and New Testaments.

Other references
Plange quasi virgo (Lament like a virgin), the third responsory for Holy Saturday, is loosely based on verses from the Book of Joel: the title comes from Joel 1:8.

See also

Joel 1

References

Further reading 
See also works on the Minor Prophets as a whole.
 Achtemeier, Elizabeth. Minor Prophets I. New International Biblical Commentary. (Hendrickson, 1999)
 Ahlström, Gösta W. Joel and the Temple Cult of Jerusalem. Supplements to Vetus Testamentum 21. (Brill, 1971)
 Allen, Leslie C. The Books of Joel, Obadiah, Jonah & Micah. New International Commentary on the Old Testament. (Eerdmans, 1976)
 Anders, Max E. & Butler, Trent C. Hosea–Micah. Holman Old Testament Commentary. (B&H Publishing, 2005)
 Assis, Elie. Joel: A Prophet Between Calamity and Hope (LHBOTS, 581), New York: Bloomsbury, 2013
 Baker, David W. Joel, Obadiah, Malachi. NIV Application Commentary. (Zondervan, 2006)
 Barton, John. Joel & Obadiah: a Commentary. Old Testament Library. (Westminster John Knox, 2001)
 Birch, Bruce C. Hosea, Joel & Amos. Westminster Bible Companion. (Westminster John Knox, 1997)
 Busenitz, Irvin A. Commentary on Joel and Obadiah. Mentor Commentary. (Mentor, 2003)
 Calvin, John. Joel, Amos, Obadiah. Calvin's Bible Commentaries. (Forgotten Books, 2007)
 Coggins, Richard. Joel and Amos. New Century Bible Commentary. (Sheffield Academic Press, 2000)
 Crenshaw, James L. Joel: a New Translation with Introduction and Commentary. The Anchor Bible. (Yale University Press, 1995)
 Finley, Thomas J. Joel, Amos, Obadiah: an Exegetical Commentary. (Biblical Studies Press, 2003)
 Gæbelein, Frank E. (ed) Daniel and the Minor Prophets. The Expositor's Bible Commentary, Volume 7. (Zondervan, 1985)
 Garrett, Duane A. Hosea, Joel. The New American Commentary. (B&H Publishing, 1997)
 Hubbard, David Allen. Joel and Amos: an Introduction and Commentary. Tyndale Old Testament Commentary. (Inter-Varsity Press, 1990)
 Limburg, James. Hosea–Micah. Interpretation – a Bible Commentary for Teaching & Preaching. (Westminster John Knox, 1988)
 Mason, Rex. Zephaniah, Habakkuk, Joel. Old Testament Guides. (JSOT Press, 1994)
 McQueen, Larry R.M. Joel and the Spirit: the Cry of a Prophetic Hermeneutic. (CTP, 2009)
 Ogden, Graham S. & Deutsch, Richard R.  A Promise of Hope – a Call to Obedience: a Commentary on the Books of Joel & Malachi. International Theological Commentary (Eerdmans/ Hansel, 1987)
 Ogilvie, John Lloyd. Hosea, Joel, Amos, Obadiah, Jonah. Communicator's Commentary 20. (Word, 1990)
 Price, Walter K. The Prophet Joel and the Day of the Lord. (Moody, 1976)
 Prior, David. The Message of Joel, Micah, and Habakkuk: Listening to the Voice of God. The Bible Speaks Today. (Inter-Varsity Press, 1999)
 Pohlig, James N. An Exegetical Summary of Joel. (SIL International, 2003)
 Roberts, Matis (ed). Trei asar : The Twelve Prophets: a New Translation with a Commentary Anthologized from Talmudic, Midrashic, and Rabbinic Sources. Vol. 1: Hosea. Joel. Amos. Obadiah.  (Mesorah, 1995)
 Robertson, O. Palmer. Prophet of the Coming Day of the Lord: the Message of Joel. Welwyn Commentary. (Evangelical Press, 1995)
 Simkins, Ronald. Yahweh's Activity in History and Nature in the Book of Joel. Ancient Near Eastern Texts & Studies 10 (Lewiston, New York: Edwin Mellen Press, 1991)
 Simundson, Daniel J. Hosea–Micah. Abingdon Old Testament Commentaries. (Abingdon, 2005)
 Stuart, Douglas. Hosea–Jonah. Word Biblical Commentary 31. (Word, 1987)
 Sweeney, Marvin A. The Twelve Prophets, Vol. 1: Hosea–Jonah. Berit Olam – Studies in Hebrew Narrative & Poetry. (Liturgical Press, 2000)
 Wolff, Hans Walter. A Commentary on the Books of the Prophets Joel & Amos. Hermeneia – a Critical and Historical Commentary on the Bible. (Augsburg Fortress, 1977)

External links 

 Jewish Encyclopedia: Book of Joel
 Catholic Encyclopedia: Joel
 Jewish translations:
 Yoel – Joel (Judaica Press) translation [with Rashi's commentary] at Chabad.org
 Christian translations:
 Online Bible at GospelHall.org (ESV)
 Joel at The Great Books (New Revised Standard Version)
 Joel at BibleGateway (New International Version and others)
 Joel at BlueLetter Bible (King James Version and others, plus commentaries)
  Various versions

 
9th-century BC books
8th-century BC books
7th-century BC books
6th-century BC books
5th-century BC books
1st-millennium BC books
Twelve Minor Prophets